The Handball Tournament at the 1987 Pan American Games was held from August 9 to August 17, 1987 in Indianapolis, United States. The sport made its debut at the Pan Am Games with two tournaments, one for the men (from August 9 to August 17) and one for the women (from August 10 to August 16).

Men's tournament

Final ranking

United States are qualified for the 1988 Summer Olympics in Seoul, South Korea.
Cuba is qualified for the 1989 Men's Handball World Championship for B-nations in France.

Awards

Women's tournament

Final ranking

United States are qualified for the 1988 Summer Olympics in Seoul, South Korea.
Canada and Brazil are qualified for the 1987 Women's Handball World Championship for B-nations in Bulgaria.

Awards

Medal table

References

External links
 Results at Todor66.com : Men's Tournament, Women's Tournament
 

P
1987
Events at the 1987 Pan American Games
Handball in the United States